Elvis 56 is a compilation album of studio master recordings by American singer and musician Elvis Presley made during 1956, released by RCA Records in 1996. The original sessions took place at RCA Studios in Nashville and New York, and at Radio Recorders in Hollywood.

Contents 
The disc presents five singles with five B-sides, five tracks from his debut album, and six tracks from his second long-player, Elvis. All were both recorded and released in the title year of the disc, 1956, except for "Too Much," released in January 1957. An alternate and earlier take of "Heartbreak Hotel" included is previously unreleased. "Elvis '56" also contains much more reverb and tape echo than the original recordings.

By concentrating on the rhythm numbers rather than the country material and the ballads, this compilation showcases Presley the early icon of rock and roll in the 1950s, also arguing for this particular year as being his most notable in the decade, and perhaps even that of his entire career.

Track listing 
Chart positions for LPs and EPs from Billboard Top Pop Albums chart; positions for singles from Billboard Pop Singles chart.

Personnel 
 Elvis Presley – vocal, guitar
 Scotty Moore – guitar
 Chet Atkins – guitar
 Floyd Cramer – piano
 Shorty Long – piano
 Gordon Stoker – piano, backing vocals
 Bill Black – bass
 D.J. Fontana – drums
 The Jordanaires – backing vocals
 Ben Speer – backing vocals
 Brock Speer – backing vocals

Charts

References 

Elvis Presley compilation albums
1996 compilation albums
RCA Records compilation albums
Compilation albums published posthumously